Nablyudatel (The Watcher) was a Russian monthly literary and political magazine published in Saint Petersburg in 1882–1904. Its editor and publisher was Alexander Pyatkovsky. There was a supplement to it, a daily newspaper called Glasnost (1897-1904). A right-wing, pro-monarchist publication, particularly harsh on what it perceived as being "Jewish interests", Nablyudatel was unpopular with both Marxist and liberal critics, but its literary and scientific sections were respectable, and among the authors whose works appeared there, were Vladimir Bezobrazov, Ieronim Yasinsky, Liodor Palmin, Pavel Zasodimsky, Pyotr Boborykin, Daniil Mordovtsev, Vasily Nemirovich-Danchenko, Konstantin Balmont, Nikolai Minsky and Konstantin Fofanov. It was the publication of latter's 1888 poem "The Mystery of Love" (Таинство любви) that brought the journal its biggest trouble with censorship, resulting in six months suspension.

References

1882 establishments in the Russian Empire
1904 disestablishments in the Russian Empire
Defunct literary magazines published in Europe
Defunct magazines published in Russia
Magazines established in 1882
Magazines disestablished in 1904
Magazines published in Saint Petersburg
Russian-language magazines
Literary magazines published in Russia
Defunct political magazines
Political magazines published in Russia
Monthly magazines published in Russia